The 2014 Kazakhstan Hockey Cup was the 12th edition of the Kazakhstan Hockey Cup, the national ice hockey cup competition in Kazakhstan. Tent teams participated and Yertis Pavlodar won its 1st cup.

First round

Group A

Group B

Final round
Match for 3rd place:
Nomad Astana - Beibarys Atyrau 2-1
Final:
Yertis Pavlodar - Arlan Kokshetau 4-1

References

2013–14 in Kazakhstani ice hockey
Kazakhstan Hockey Cup